The 2003–04 Cymru Alliance was the fourteenth season of the Cymru Alliance after its establishment in 1990. The league was won by Airbus UK.

League table

External links
Cymru Alliance

Cymru Alliance seasons
2
Wales